Marktl, or often unofficially called Marktl am Inn ("little market on the River Inn"), is a village and historic market municipality in the state of Bavaria, Germany, near the Austrian border, in the Altötting district of Upper Bavaria. The most notable neighbouring town is Altötting. Marktl has approximately 2,800 inhabitants.

Marktl was the birthplace of Pope Benedict XVI (previously Cardinal Joseph Aloisius Ratzinger), who succeeded Pope John Paul II as the 265th head of the Roman Catholic Church. In 2013, he abdicated and was succeeded by Pope Francis.

History
 13th century – Established as the power base of the Counts of Leonberg.
 1297 – Construction of the first church dedicated to Saint Oswald within the diocese of Stammham, it was sponsored by Berengar III, Count of Leonberg and was consecrated by Bishop Albert of Chiemsee.
 1422 – Duke Henry XVI of Bavaria grants market privileges to the town.
 1477 – Duke Louis the Rich grants a coat of arms to the citizens of Marktl, showing a ship hook and caper measure, as symbols of navigation and trade
 1577 – Duke Albert V permits that the assignment of a priest to the Marktl branch church
 1697 – Prince-Elector Max Emanuel arranges the construction of the first bridge across the river Inn at Marktl
 1701 – Lightning hits the tower of Saint Oswald church, which results in the incineration of the whole market
 1851 – Marktl, which had been only a subsidiary of the parish of Stammham, becomes an independent parish
 1857 – Bishop Heinrich von Hofstetter consecrates the newly built parish church of Saint Oswald
 1871 – Marktl gets a railway station when the railway line from Munich to Simbach is built
 1919 – Construction of a protective dam on the Inn River as a safeguard against constant flooding
 1927 – Completion of the first concrete bridge over the Inn and construction of the "Neue Strasse" (New Street) to bypass the market
 1965 – Remodel of parish church at Saint Oswald; parish hall is built
 1970–1972 – The formerly independent municipalities of Marktlberg and Schuetzing are incorporated into Marktl
 1980 – A mechanical-biological purification plant is built
 1981–1983 – The Bürgerhaus ("Citizens' House") is built (includes a public library, rooms for events, a skittles alley etc.)
 1984–1987 – Construction of fire-brigade stations in Marktl and Marktlberg
 1989 – Connection to Autobahn A 94
 1996 – Redesign of the market square
 2000 – Redesign of the square in front of the railway station
 2005 – Election of Pope Benedict XVI and bottling of commemorative "Papstbier" (Pope bier) by local brewer Weideneder for sale to the public
 2006 – Visit of Pope Benedict XVI.

Notable people
 Georg Lankensperger (* 1779; † 1847), cartwright
 Paul Devrient (* 1890; † 1973), opera tenor and director
 Hugo Grau (* 1899; † 1984), veterinary
 Benedictus XVI (* 1927 as Joseph Aloisius Ratzinger; † 2022), 265th Pope

Coat of arms
Marktl's coat of arms features a ship's hook and caper measure as symbols of navigation and trade, under the blue and white lozenges of the duchy of Bavaria.

Twin towns — sister cities
Marktl is twinned with:

  Wadowice, Poland (2006)
  Gönnheim, Germany
  Sotto il Monte Giovanni XXIII, Italy (2009)

References

External links

markt-marktl.de Official Homepage
Marktl am Inn Sleepy Bavarian Village on the World Map.

Altötting (district)
Populated places on the Inn (river)
13th-century establishments in the Holy Roman Empire